Richard Thomas (1880–1958) was an Anglican priest in Australia. He was the second Bishop of Willochra.

Early life 
Thomas was born on  24 October 1880 at Lydney, Gloucestershire, England, the son of railway clerk Daniel Thomas, and his wife Jane, (née Griffiths).  He was educated at Monmouth Grammar School.

Religious life 
Thomas was ordained in 1909. He began his career with  a curacy at St John Baptist, Coventry after which he emigrated to Australia to become a Bush Brother. From 1923 to 1925 he was  Archdeacon of North Queensland before his ordination to the episcopate of Willochra.

Later life 
On 16 April 1958, while in England to attend the Lambeth Conference, Thomas died at Grays Thurrock, Essex. He was buried at Cowbridge, Glamorgan, Wales.

References

External links 

1881 births
People educated at Monmouth School for Boys
Anglican archdeacons in Australia
20th-century Anglican bishops in Australia
Anglican bishops of Willochra
1958 deaths